Hussein Dhaifallah al-Awadhi (born 1957) is a Yemeni politician and journalist. He served as Minister of Information from 2001 to 2006.

Education 
He was born in 1957 in Al-Bayda Governorate. He obtained a BA degree in economics and political sciences from Sana'a University, diploma in international politics from Sana'a University and MA in journalism from University of Maryland.

Career 
 Member of the International Center of Journalists, Washington
 1994–1999 Secretary General of the Yemeni Olympic Committee
 1986–1996 Chairman, Yemeni Union of Sports Media Information officer, UN Society
 Deputy Chairman of Yemeni Journalists’ Syndicate
 Chief Editor of Saba News Agency
 Professor of Arab Media and Specialised Journalism, Sana'a University
 2001–2006 Minister of Information

References 

1957 births
Information ministers of Yemen
21st-century Yemeni politicians
21st-century Yemeni journalists
People from Al Bayda Governorate
Sanaa University alumni
Living people